The ASP World Tour is a professional competitive surfing league.  It is run by the Association of Surfing Professionals. The 2001 ASP Men's World Tour was restricted to five contests and the 2001 ASP Women's World Tour was restricted to three contests, due to the tragic events of September 11, 2001.

Men's World Tour

Tournaments
Source

Final standings
Source

Women's World Tour

Tournaments
Source

Final standings
 Source

External links
 Official Site

World Surf League
ASP World Tour